"Rock 'n' Roll Bolero" is a song by the British rock band Slade, released in 1978 as a non-album single. It was written by lead vocalist Noddy Holder and bassist Jim Lea. The song failed to make an appearance in the UK charts.

Background
Having returned to the UK from the United States in 1976, Slade found themselves out-of-favour at the time of the UK's Punk rock explosion. Slade's waning success soon led to the band playing small gigs, including universities and clubs, but despite being successful at filling small venues, their new records were barely selling. "Rock 'n' Roll Bolero" was released in October 1978 and was one of the band's string of singles to fail to chart during this period.

"Rock 'n' Roll Bolero" featured the return of Lea's electric violin; the first time on a Slade single since 1971's "Coz I Luv You". The song was originally recorded in June 1978 under the working title "I've Been Rejected". In July, the band re-recorded the song as "Rock 'n' Roll Bolero" at Portland Studios in London. In a 1979 fan club interview, Lea said of the song: "The comment on "Rock 'n' Roll Bolero" is that it was different for Slade, but it was ordinary compared to everything else that was going around at the time. But I really dig the record myself!" He further added: "It's great on record, but it's us thinking, it's not us being ourselves."

Release
"Rock 'n' Roll Bolero" was released on 7" vinyl by Barn Records in the UK, Belgium and Germany. The B-side, "It's Alright Buy Me", was exclusive to the single and would later appear on the band's 2007 compilation B-Sides. In France, the A-side and B-sides were switched, with "It's Alright Buy Me" becoming the A-side.

Critical reception
Upon release, Record Mirror described the song as a "more mellow Slade", adding: "they're in dire need of a hit and this could be the one". In a review of the live album Slade Alive, Vol. 2, Superpop commented: "...one complaint though, they did not include "Rock 'n' Roll Bolero", a classic no doubt." Geoff Ginsberg of AllMusic retrospectively stated in a review of the bootleg album Gospel According to Noddy!: ""Rock N Roll Bolero," is heard here (by many) for the first time. Even more amazing is the B-side, "It's All Right By Me," which is unbelievably catchy and just cooks."

Formats
7" Single
"Rock 'n' Roll Bolero" - 4:04
"It's Alright Buy Me" - 3:20

Personnel
Slade
Noddy Holder - lead vocals, rhythm guitar, producer
Dave Hill - lead guitar, backing vocals, producer
Jim Lea - electric violin, bass, backing vocals, producer
Don Powell - drums, producer

Additional personnel
Chas Chandler - producer of "It's Alright Buy Me"

References

1978 songs
1978 singles
Slade songs
Songs written by Noddy Holder
Songs written by Jim Lea
Song recordings produced by Jim Lea
Song recordings produced by Noddy Holder
Song recordings produced by Dave Hill
Song recordings produced by Don Powell